Ayvaköy can refer to:

 Ayvaköy, Nilüfer
 Ayvaköy, Yapraklı